Ram Prasad Gurung (born 14 November 1945) is a Nepalese boxer. He competed in the men's lightweight event at the 1964 Summer Olympics.

References

External links
 

1945 births
Living people
People from Syangja District
Nepalese male boxers
Olympic boxers of Nepal
Boxers at the 1964 Summer Olympics
Lightweight boxers
20th-century Nepalese people